Mount Sizer is a prominent peak located on Blue Ridge in Henry W. Coe State Park, just east of Morgan Hill, California. Because Mount Sizer is the highest point on Blue Ridge and under  from the park's headquarters, it makes it an ideal destination for day hikers. There are two ways to reach the summit. One by trails and one by a combination of trail and fire road. The fire road route leads almost directly up Blue Ridge to Mount Sizer and is affectionately nicknamed "The Shortcut". The park map by Pine Ridge Association lists the peak at 3216' elevation, but some other sources seem to place it at 3219 feet.

References

External links 
 
 

Mountains of Santa Clara County, California
Mountains of the San Francisco Bay Area
Mountains of Northern California